Clervie Ngounoue and Diana Shnaider defeated Kayla Cross and Victoria Mboko in the final, 6–4, 6–3 to win the girls' doubles title at the 2022 Australian Open.

Alex Eala and Priska Madelyn Nugroho were the defending champions, but Nugroho was no longer eligible to participate in junior events, whilst Eala chose not to participate.

Seeds

Draw

Finals

Top half

Bottom half

References

External links 
 Draw at itftennis.com
 Draw at ausopen.com

2022
Girls' Doubles